Mesagroicus is a genus of broad-nosed weevils in the beetle family Curculionidae. There are at least 40 described species in Mesagroicus.

Species
These 40 species belong to the genus Mesagroicus:

 Mesagroicus affaber Faust, 1885
 Mesagroicus amicalis Magnano, Osella & Abbazzi, 2008
 Mesagroicus analis Reitter, 1903
 Mesagroicus anatolicus K.Daniel & J.Daniel, 1902
 Mesagroicus angustirostris Faust, 1882
 Mesagroicus auliensis Reitter, 1903
 Mesagroicus auratus Korotyaev, 1979
 Mesagroicus conicirostris Reitter, 1903
 Mesagroicus depressipennis Pic, 1897
 Mesagroicus elongatus Reitter, 1915
 Mesagroicus elongellus Emden, 1936
 Mesagroicus erinaceus Faust, 1883
 Mesagroicus fasciatus Reitter, 1903
 Mesagroicus fuscus Y-Q.Chen, 1991
 Mesagroicus graecus Stierlin, 1890
 Mesagroicus hauseri Reitter, 1903
 Mesagroicus helleri Reitter, 1903
 Mesagroicus herricki (Pierce, 1910)
 Mesagroicus hispidus Buchanan, 1929
 Mesagroicus hofferi Penecke, 1917
 Mesagroicus incertus Buchanan
 Mesagroicus lederi Faust, 1887
 Mesagroicus manifestus Faust, 1883
 Mesagroicus minor Buchanan, 1929
 Mesagroicus nevadianus Buchanan
 Mesagroicus oblongus Buchanan, 1929
 Mesagroicus obscurus Boheman, 1840
 Mesagroicus occipitalis Germar, 1848
 Mesagroicus ocularis Buchanan, 1929
 Mesagroicus parmerensis Burke, 1960
 Mesagroicus petraeus Faust, 1885
 Mesagroicus piliferus (Boheman, 1833)
 Mesagroicus plumosus Buchanan, 1929
 Mesagroicus poriventris Reitter, 1903
 Mesagroicus rusticanus Faust, 1883
 Mesagroicus stierlini Reitter, 1903
 Mesagroicus strigisquamosus Buchanan, 1929
 Mesagroicus sulcicollis Reitter, 1903
 Mesagroicus sus Faust, 1883
 Mesagroicus viduatus Faust, 1883

References

Further reading

 
 
 
 

Entiminae
Articles created by Qbugbot